Baileys Chute, often misspelled Bailey's Chute, is one in a series of small waterfalls along the Clearwater River in Wells Gray Provincial Park, British Columbia, Canada.

Name origin
Baileys Chute is named after Jim Bailey, an engineer who drowned in 1952 after his canoe capsized in the river just downstream of the falls.

Structure
The falls take the form of a gradual sliding cascade. The force of the water impacting the river produces a 1.5 metre tall standing wave that propagates downstream from the falls.

Salmon
Baileys Chute is a good place to view the Chinook as they try to leap the falls from mid-August through September. They are the largest of the Pacific salmon, weighing from 8 kg to 22 kg. Most spawn at The Horseshoe further downstream after a life cycle of four to six years.

References

External links

Waterfalls of British Columbia
Kamloops Division Yale Land District